Lilo & Stitch 2: Stitch Has a Glitch is a 2005 American direct-to-video animated science fiction comedy-drama film produced by the Australian office of Disneytoon Studios. It is the third film released in the Lilo & Stitch franchise and the second film in the franchise's chronology, taking place between the events of 2002's Lilo & Stitch—to which this film serves a direct sequel to—and the 2003 direct-to-video film Stitch! The Movie as it serves as prequel, taking place shortly before they capture the other 625 experiments. This is the final time that Jason Scott Lee voiced David, and the only film in which Daveigh Chase did not reprise her role as Lilo and is replaced by Dakota Fanning. Like the first film, Lilo & Stitch 2: Stitch Has a Glitch also featured Skywalker Sound.

Plot
Sometime after the events of the first film, Stitch awakens from a nightmare about turning bad again and causing destruction to Earth, including hurting Lilo. After consoling Stitch by reminding him that she knows he would never cause harm to her, Lilo tests his goodness level by having him do a few good deeds. Upon discovering that they are late for hula class, they use their hovercraft to get there.

While at the hula class, Kumu announces that Lilo and her classmates will be prepared to perform at the local May Day festival. Each student is required to create an original dance. Lilo is inspired when Kumu tells her about her mother being in the festival at her age and winning, giving her a picture of the event. After the hula class ends, Mertle insults Lilo by telling her that she will never be like her mother, causing her to start a fight with her. However, after taking pictures of the brawl, Stitch forgets to flush the evidence. Kumu thinks that Lilo is not ready for the competition because of the fight with Mertle, but Lilo says that she is ready and "triple promises" to be good.

While preparing for the competition, Lilo and Stitch have a hard time coming up with ideas and Nani wants them to enjoy their family fun night. While watching Them! on family fun night, Stitch's past comes back to haunt him and he goes berserk in the house. It turns out that after Stitch was created, Jumba did not get the chance to fully charge Stitch's molecules as the intergalactic police arrested him, disrupting the process. At first, this glitch causes Stitch to revert to his old destructive programming against his free will, but it will ultimately kill him if Jumba cannot create a fusion chamber before Stitch's energy runs out for good.

Meanwhile, Stitch's uncontrollable destructive behavior drives a wedge between him and Lilo and threatens to ruin her chances for success at the hula competition. Lilo and Stitch try to be inspired for their hula, but Stitch keeps malfunctioning because of his molecules. Since Lilo is so concerned about winning the competition, she fails to notice Stitch's glitch, which is not his fault, and she believes his new behavior is deliberate and begins to neglect him, much to his chagrin and eventual distress. In a subplot, Nani's boyfriend, David, believes Nani is losing interest in him. Pleakley comes to his aid and tries to give advice on romance.

Eventually, the two devise a hula based on the legend of Hiʻiaka. Lilo gets increasingly mad at Stitch as he ruins their practice sessions. To make matters worse, Jumba is having problems creating the fusion chamber because he doesn't have the proper alien technology to build one and must resort to using mere household objects. However, on the day of the competition, Stitch arrives just before Lilo is to perform, wishing her luck. The two reconcile as Jumba finally completes the fusion chamber. However, Stitch has another abrupt fit. Lilo, confused, tries to ask Stitch if he's okay, but he accidentally scratches her face like in his nightmare. Knowing that Stitch would never want to intentionally hurt her, Lilo finally realizes that something is wrong with him and tries to ask what's wrong, but Stitch, greatly horrified and remorseful that he hurt her, runs off to leave Earth, as he believes himself to be too dangerous.

In the middle of her performance, Lilo ultimately forfeits the competition and runs off to help Stitch. As Stitch attempts to leave Earth, Lilo and the rest of the family desperately try to get him to return so they can re-charge him. While taking off, Stitch suffers his most violent and painful outburst, which causes him to lose control and crash the spaceship in the Hawaiian mountains. Lilo rides over to the crash site in their hovercraft, where she finds Stitch injured and close to death. She hurriedly gets him into Jumba's fusion chamber, but it's too late and Lilo watches in tears as Stitch apologizes one last time and dies. When a disheartened Jumba takes Stitch out of the chamber, Lilo holds him close and softly apologizes for her treatment of him, having finally understood that while she kept saying that she needed him, he needed her more. She says that he is her ohana and, therefore, will always love him and breaks down in tears. Everyone grieves for a time as Lilo weeps, but Stitch eventually awakens, much to everyone's happiness. Pleakley is at a loss for words, to which Jumba explains what happened: Stitch was revived by Lilo's love.

Later that night, the family (along with David) performs Lilo's hula dance on the empty stage, and Nani tells Lilo that their mother would be proud of her, and a star twinkles in the sky to justify.

Cast
Some of the original cast returned to play their characters, however Kevin Michael Richardson, Ving Rhames, and Zoe Caldwell do not play their roles given the reason why Cobra Bubbles, the Grand Councilwoman, and Gantu are absent in the film. Also Daveigh Chase was replaced by Dakota Fanning as Lilo and Liliana Mumy replaced Miranda Paige Walls as Mertle Edmonds. This film is the last time that Jason Scott Lee voiced David in the franchise.
 Chris Sanders as Stitch, a blue koala-like illegal genetic experiment (of which he is Experiment 626) from the planet Turo who finds his place as part of an extended family on Earth, but begins having malfunctioning glitches as his molecules were not completely charged when he was created. Noel Cleary served as the supervising animator for Stitch.
 Dakota Fanning as Lilo Pelekai, a young Hawaiian girl who adopted Stitch  and is determined to win a hula competition that her late mother previously won without realizing that Stitch is malfuctioning. Kevin Peaty served as the supervising animator for Lilo.
 Tia Carrere as Nani Pelekai, Lilo's older sister and legal guardian, who carries the burden of supporting herself, Lilo and now Stitch both financially and parentally. Robert Mason served as the supervising animator for Nani.
 David Ogden Stiers as Dr. Jumba Jookiba, a Kweltikwan mad scientist formerly employed by Galaxy Defense Industries who created Stitch, and now watches over him with the family they made on Earth, When Stitch begins glitching due to not being fully charged when he created him Jumba tries to build a Fusion Chamber to charge his molecules before Stitch shuts down permanently. Stephen Baker served as the supervising animator for Jumba.
 Kevin McDonald as Wendy Pleakley, a Plorgonarian agent formerly employed by the United Galactic Federation, who assigned him as Jumba's assistant on Earth, who now lives with his partner on Earth along with Lilo, Nani, and Stitch. Nadine Wagner-Westbarkey served as the supervising animator for Pleakley.
 Jason Scott Lee as David Kawena, Nani's surfing star boyfriend.
 Liliana Mumy as Mertle Edmonds, a young girl who is one of Lilo's classmates and her main rival.
 Kunewa Mook as Moses Puloki (credited as "Kumu"), Lilo's hula teacher.
 Emily Osment as Additional Voices
 Jennifer Hale as Additional Voices
 Paul C. Vogt as Gator Guard and Various Voices

Production

Cast and recording
This is the only film in the series without actress Daveigh Chase who voices Lilo in all other Lilo & Stitch films. According to Disney Animation Studios, Chase was so busy working on Lilo & Stitch: The Series that she suggested to have renowned child actress and good friend Dakota Fanning play her. Chris Sanders, the writer/director of the first film, did not participate fully. The film also became Disney's first and only direct-to-video animated film to be rated PG by the MPAA for some mild action. Jason Scott Lee, who voiced David in the first film, reprised his role, making it the final time he voiced the character.

Animation
The animation was produced by Walt Disney Animation (Australia) Inc., Australis Productions, and A. Film A/S, although those animation studios were never credited, except for Australis Productions.

The Origin of Stitch short film

The Origin of Stitch is an animated short film included on the DVD release of Lilo & Stitch 2: Stitch Has a Glitch. The short has a total running time of 4:35 minutes and serves as a bridge between Stitch Has a Glitch and Stitch! The Movie (as well as Lilo & Stitch: The Series). In the short, Stitch discovers Jumba's secret computer that reveals what creatures Jumba had used to create Stitch and also hints at his other 625 experiments. Stitch is scared to find out what a monster he is, only for Jumba to come and explain how he found love when he met Lilo. The short was directed by Mike Disa and co-directed by Tony Bancroft.

Toonacious Family Entertainment produced the short with coloring done by Powerhouse Animation of Austin, Texas.

Soundtrack

Disney's Lilo & Stitch Island Favorites Featuring Songs from Lilo & Stitch 2: Stitch Has a Glitch is the soundtrack album to Lilo & Stitch 2. The soundtrack is partly an updated repackaging of another album also titled Disney's Lilo & Stitch: Island Favorites that was released in November 2002, reusing some of the same songs that appeared on that album. The song "He Mele No Lilo" had been included in the first film, Lilo & Stitch. "Hawaiian Roller Coaster Ride", also from the original film, appears in two versions; a cover of the song by Jump5 (who performed the Lilo & Stitch: The Series theme song "Aloha, E Komo Mai") and a remixed version of the original performed by Mark Kealii Hoomalu and the Kamehameha Schools Children's Chorus. The soundtrack also includes Tia Carrere's (the voice of Nani) version of "Aloha ʻOe" as performed in the original film, but with additional backing instrumentation. It was released by Walt Disney Records on August 30, 2005.

Charts

Critical reception

On critical response aggregation website, Rotten Tomatoes, the film has a rating of 40%, and an average score of 5.5 out of 10 based on 10 reviews.

Hi-Def Digest said, "The humor in the second movie is juvenile, and lacking in the wit that makes the first so distinctive. The characterizations are heavily simplified, to the point where some of the characters feel dumbed down. Also, a lame subplot involving one of Lilo's peers feels silly and has a poor resolution. Even worse is the false sentimentality of the climax, which feels like cheap heartstring-tugging". ReelFilm gave a 2.5 out of 5 star rating, saying "Lilo & Stitch 2 is cute enough - there are a few genuinely funny moments here, while the voice acting is surprisingly effective - although the film does eventually wear out its welcome".

In a 2019 list of direct-to-video sequels, prequels, and "mid-quels" to Disney animated films, Petrana Radulovic of Polygon ranked Lilo & Stitch 2 first out of twenty-six films on the list, appreciating its faithfulness to the original film's tone. She stated, "The other two Lilo & Stitch sequels were just fine, but they didn’t capture the essence of what made the original special, choosing instead to focus on aliens. Stitch Has a Glitch, however, manages to balance the alien story with the human one. [...] Overall, the movie verges on being cheesy, but it is a satisfying, heartwarming type of goo, with very funny moments and gags." In a similar list in 2020, Lisa Wehrstedt of Insider ranked Lilo & Stitch 2 second out of twenty-five films on her list, behind The Lion King II: Simba's Pride. Werhstedt, who considered the film "heartwarming" and "sweet", wrote that the film "manages to keep the perfect mix of cute and wacky that made the first one so charming."

At the 33rd Annie Awards, Lilo & Stitch 2 won the Annie Award for Best Animated Home Entertainment Production.

Home media
Although originally slated for a theatrical release (like Return to Never Land), it was released to DVD and VHS on August 30, 2005. This is the last Lilo & Stitch film to have a VHS release; the fourth film, Leroy & Stitch, released in 2006, would later be only released on DVD.

The DVD extras include a short film called The Origin of Stitch which features a newly redesigned Stitch, a music video for the theme song "Hawaiian Roller Coaster Ride" by Jump5, two games ("Jumba's Experiment Profiler" and "Where's Pleakley?" - similar to Where's Wally?).

Notes

References

External links

 
 
 

2005 films
2005 animated films
2005 direct-to-video films
2000s American animated films
American children's animated comic science fiction films
American children's animated comedy films
American children's animated drama films
American films with live action and animation
American sequel films
Animated drama films
Animated films about friendship
Children's comedy-drama films
Annie Award winners
Direct-to-video sequel films
Disney direct-to-video animated films
DisneyToon Studios animated films
Films scored by Joel McNeely
Animated films about children
Films about competitions
Films set in Hawaii
Lilo & Stitch (franchise)
Films directed by Tony Leondis
Films with screenplays by Tony Leondis
2005 directorial debut films
2000s children's animated films
2000s English-language films